Broek op Langedijk (West Frisian Dutch: Broek op Lengedìk) is a village in the municipality of Dijk en Waard in the province of North Holland, the Netherlands.

History
The village was first mentioned in the 12th century as 1420 Broec, and means "swampy land on the long dike". Broek op Langedijk developed along the dike as a linear settlement. The swamp was cultivated and the so-called empire of a thousand islands was formed. The islands were used to grow cabbage and in 1887, an auction house was established in Broek op Langedijk. 

The Dutch Reformed church is a single aisled church with wooden tower from the 15th century. Around 1860, the front and tower were renovated. 

The auction house is a large wooden complex surrounded by water. It was built in 1912 and was influenced by Jugendstil. In 1968, the auction merged with the Noord-Scharwoude auction and moved. In 1974, a museum was established in the former auction which allows visitors to bid on fruit and vegetables in household portions.

Broek op Langendijk was home to 700 people in 1840. It was a separate municipality until 1941, when the municipality of Langedijk was formed. In 2022, it became part of the municipality of Dijk en Waard.

Gallery

In popular culture
The village featured in the movie Spider-Man: Far From Home. Peter Parker ends up there by accident, breaks out of a municipal holding facility and asks a local man where he is. Parker gets him to speak the village's name directly into his phone, allowing Happy Hogan to fly there to pick him up.

References

Populated places in North Holland
Former municipalities of North Holland
Geography of Dijk en Waard